Mohamed Alabbar, (born November 8, 1956) is an Emirati businessman who is best known as the founder of Emaar Properties, the developer of assets such as the Burj Khalifa and the Dubai Mall, as well as the chairman of Eagle Hills, an Abu Dhabi-based private investment and real estate development company. 

Alabbar is also a co-founder of Noon.com, an e-commerce company and the chairman of Americana Group, in food industries.

Early life
Mohamed Alabbar was born in Dubai and is the eldest of 12 children. His father was the captain of a traditional trading vessel known as a dhow and raised his children in the Rashidiya area of Dubai. In the 1970s, Alabbar received a government scholarship to study finance and business administration from The Albers School of Business and Economics at Seattle University. Alabbar graduated from Seattle University in 1981 with a degree in Business Administration. He also received an honorary doctoral degree in humanities from his alma mater in 2007 and served on its Board of Trustees until 2016.

Career
After college, Alabbar started off his career with the Central Bank of the United Arab Emirates as a banking manager.  In 1992, Alabbar returned to Dubai and began working for the government as the founding director general of the Department of Economic Development (DED). Alabbar's career led him to establish a close relationship with Sheikh Mohammed bin Rashid Al Maktoum, the Ruler of Dubai, where he later became one of Sheikh Mohammed's chief economic advisers. Alabbar worked with Sheikh Mohammed bin Rashid Al Maktoum to drive the development and growth of both Dubai's tourism industry and global reputation.

He is the founder and chairman of Africa Middle East Resources (AMER), a private company that works to unlock the value of natural resource opportunities in Africa and link them with large consumer markets in Asia. He is also the founder and major shareholder of RSH, the leading Singapore-based pan-Asian marketer, distributor and retailer of international fashion and lifestyle brands. 

In March 2015, Capital City Partners, a real estate investment fund led by Alabbar, announced plans to build a new capital in Egypt. Also in 2015, Alabbar, who sits on the board of Eagle Hills, announced plans to develop the largest mall in the Balkans in Belgrade.

Board memberships 
Alabbar chairs Eagle Hills, a UAE-based real estate development company focused on large-scale projects in high-growth international markets. He serves on the board of Emaar Malls.

Alabbar also sits on the board of Noor Investment Group, an affiliate of Dubai Group, the leading diversified financial company of Dubai Holding.

Personal life
Alabbar is a member of the endurance horse racing community in the United Arab Emirates.

References 

1956 births
Living people
Emirati businesspeople
Emirati businesspeople in real estate
People from Dubai
Seattle University alumni
Emirati male golfers